The Negrón Tunnel is an automotive tunnel which connects the provinces of Asturias and León in Northern Spain.

The tunnel is in the toll highway AP-66, which is part of the Autovía A-66, one of the longest highways in Spain. The tunnel provides an alternate route to the Puerto de Pajares, a mountain pass that is considered dangerous for motorists.

History
Initially, the first roadway was planned with a cost of 19.5m pesetas, but it rose to 70m due to several unexpected problems in the terrain. This one was started in 1976 and gave work to 1,300 people during several years. The first of the two projected tunnels was opened in 1983 and worked provisionally as a single carriageway road.

Works ended in 1997, with the opening of the second roadway in June 1997, which had  length and costed 7.443m pesetas.

Since its opening, the AP-66 is the main connection between Asturias and León.

References

External links
Video of the entering to Asturias by the Negrón Tunnel
Tunnels of AP-66 at Aucalsa website

Road tunnels in Spain
Buildings and structures in Asturias
Transport in Asturias
Tunnels completed in 1997
Toll tunnels in Europe